The Mozambique–South Africa Oil Pipeline is a proposed multiproduct petrol and diesel fuel pipeline from Maputo to Gauteng, South Africa.

Route
From there the pipeline will then continue to Kendal in Mpumalanga, where it could join the current Transnet Pipelines petroleum pipeline network. The project also foresees potential transport to neighboring countries, such as Botswana.

Technical description
The initial capacity of the pipeline will be 6 million cubic meters of oil per year.  It is possible that the maximum capacity would be higher because of the high demand.  The project foresees the refurbishment and construction of tankage and improved loading capabilities in Matola, and new tankage in Nelspruit, Mpumalanga.

The technical design of the pipeline is led by VGI Consulting Engineers. The environmental impact assessment is coordinated by Nature & Business Alliance Africa. The pipeline is expected to cost US$620 million.  The construction will start in 2009 and the pipeline is expected to be operational by 2011.

Project company
The project is to be implemented by Petroline, a joint venture between Mozambican and South African companies. The biggest shareholder is Petróleos de Moçambique (Petromoc) with the stake of 40%. Other shareholders are Gigajoule International (Pty) Ltd, Companhia de Desenvolvimento de Petroleo de Mocambique, and WOESA Consortium (Pty) Ltd. Petrofac has an option to acquire 25%+1 share interest in the project.

References

External links
 Petroline website

Energy infrastructure completed in 2011
Oil pipelines in Mozambique
Oil pipelines in South Africa
Proposed pipelines in Africa
Refined oil product pipelines
Mozambique–South Africa relations